Sérgio Luis Gardino da Silva (born 9 December 1979), commonly known as Serjão, is a Brazilian footballer who plays for Grêmio Esportivo Bagé as a striker.

Football career
Born in Alvorada, Rio Grande do Sul, Serjão only played lower league or amateur football in his country. In 2004, after a very brief spell in Uruguay, he moved to Portugal after signing with Portimonense SC in the second division, where his performances attracted the attention of Académica de Coimbra in the Primeira Liga, who acquired the player in the 2006 January transfer window.

Serjão scored his first and only goal in the top level of Portuguese football in just his second appearance, contributing to a 3–0 home win against F.C. Paços de Ferreira on 4 February 2006. However, shortly after, he returned to division two, going on to spend two seasons with F.C. Vizela.

For the 2008–09 campaign, Serjão signed with Doxa Katokopias F.C. in the Cypriot First Division. He scored a career-best 24 goals to help his team to the eighth position among 14 clubs, but netted only 19 times in the next four years combined, also playing in the country's top flight and representing AEL Limassol, Alki Larnaca FC, Ermis Aradippou, Ethnikos Achna FC and AEP Paphos FC.

References

External links

1979 births
Living people
Sportspeople from Rio Grande do Sul
Brazilian footballers
Association football forwards
Grêmio Foot-Ball Porto Alegrense players
Defensor Sporting players
Primeira Liga players
Liga Portugal 2 players
Portimonense S.C. players
Associação Académica de Coimbra – O.A.F. players
F.C. Vizela players
Cypriot First Division players
Doxa Katokopias FC players
AEL Limassol players
Alki Larnaca FC players
Ermis Aradippou FC players
Ethnikos Achna FC players
AEP Paphos FC players
Brazilian expatriate footballers
Expatriate footballers in Uruguay
Expatriate footballers in Portugal
Expatriate footballers in Cyprus
Brazilian expatriate sportspeople in Portugal
Brazilian expatriate sportspeople in Cyprus